Arhopala tindali is a butterfly in the family Lycaenidae. It was described by Carl Ribbe in 1899. It is found on the Solomon Islands and  New Britain.

References

Arhopala
Butterflies described in 1899
Butterflies of Oceania